Dance Dance Revolution Universe 3, sometimes abbreviated as DDR Universe 3, is a video game for Xbox 360. It was announced by Konami on May 15, 2008, and released on October 21, 2008. The game has new songs, a story mode, the ability to create custom songs and custom character creation.

Dance Dance Revolution Universe 3 Chinese Music Special Edition (熱舞革命宇宙3 中文曲特别版 Rèwǔ Gémìng Yǔzhòu sān Zhōngwén qū Tèbié Bǎn) is a special release of Dance Dance revolution 3 by Konami for the Xbox 360 in the Asian region. It was released on May 12, 2009, as a stand-alone game and a bundle containing a dance pad controller. Universe 3 Chinese Music Special Edition is based on the North American release of Dance Dance Revolution Universe 3 with 21 additional songs added to the game. The new music is localized to Hong Kong and Taiwanese artists and groups.

Development
Dance Dance Revolution Universe 3 Chinese Music Special Edition was announced in late 2008 by Konami Digital Entertainment Limited, Konami's Hong Kong based subsidiary. An official site was launched stating that Chinese Music Special Edition would contain 60 English songs in addition to 20 exclusive Chinese pop songs from Hong Kong and Taiwan. The game was originally intended to be released before Christmas of 2008 and was delayed until May 2009.

Gameplay

Dance Dance Revolution Universe 3 Chinese Music Special Edition will include the standard Dance Dance Revolution gameplay formula as well as new features first introduced in Dance Dance Revolution Universe 3 released in North America in 2008.

DJ mode
DJ mode allows players to edit the music included in the game to create their own mixes.

Quest mode
First seen in Dance Dance Revolution Ultramix 4, Quest mode lets players travel from locale to locale competing in dance offs with computer controlled dancers. As players progress through their quest, new songs and other items are unlocked for use in-game.

Edit Mode
Edit Mode allows players to make their own steps for a chosen song or make a video background for a chosen song.

Music
Songs in bold represent specialized record company licensing. Songs highlighted in red denote "boss songs" with expert/oni difficulties rated a 10.
{|class="wikitable"
!style="background:#ffffff;"|Song
!style="background:#ffffff;"|Artist
!style="background:#ffffff;"|Other information
|-
!colspan="3" style="background:#ffffff;"|New licensed songs
|-style="background:#ffff88;"
|"A Fifth Of Beethoven"
|Walter Murphy and the Big Apple Band
|from the album A Fifth of Beethoven
|-style="background:#ffff88;"
|"Alice"
|Moby
|from the album Last Night
|-style="background:#ffff88;"
|"All Over Again"
|Blu Mar Ten
|A Different Drum license
|-style="background:#ffff88;"
|"Bad Taste"
|The Divys
|Exclusively licensed song
|-style="background:#ffff88;"
|"The Bomb (These Sounds Fall Into My Mind)"
|The Bucketheads
|from the album All in the Mind
|-style="background:#ffff88;"
|"Canned Heat"
|Jamiroquai
|from the album Synkronized
|-style="background:#ffff88;"
|"Conga"
|Miami Sound Machine
|from the album Primitive Love
|-style="background:#ffff88;"
|"Dancing Machine"
|Jackson 5
|from the album G.I.T.: Get It Together
|-style="background:#ffff88;"
|"Doki Doki (Panik Mix)" 
|smile.dk
|from the "Doki Doki" CD single
|-style="background:#ffff88;"
|"Gutterpunk"
|Noisia feat. Bex Riley
|from the "Gutterpunk" CD single
|-style="background:#ffff88;"
|"If (Dave Aude Remix)"
|Colette
|from the "If" CD single
|-style="background:#ffff88;"
|"Man With The Hex"
|Atomic Fireballs
|from the album Birth of the Swerve
|-style="background:#ffff88;"
|"Over"
|Mark Hill Presents Kelly Marie
|Avex HOUSE NATION license
|-style="background:#ffff88;"
|"parade"
|Witchery SKANK
|from the album Cherish!!
|-style="background:#ffff88;"
|"Return of the Machines (Radio Mix)"
|Oforia feat. Bwicked
|A Different Drum license
|-style="background:#ffff88;"
|"Watch Us Work It"
|Devo
|"Watch Us Work It" digital release
|-style="background:#ffffff;"
!colspan="3"|Konami collaboration tracks
|-style="background:#dd66ff;"
|"30 Lives (Up-Up-Down-Dance Mix)"
|The Motion Sick
|DDR Original Song Contest winner
|-style="background:#dd66ff;"
|"Burn Out" 
|Beatdrop
|Commissioned song
|-style="background:#dd66ff;"
|"Caught In the Moment"
|Entona
|Commissioned song
|-style="background:#dd66ff;"
|"Dancin' My Way"
|DeeJayz Paradize feat. Thomas Howard
|Commissioned song
|-style="background:#dd66ff;"
|"Don't Don't Go Away (Ricardo Autobahn Remix)" 
|Foxxie
|Disko Warp Music license
|-style="background:#dd66ff;"
|"freshmagicgroove"
|IKAAN.fresh!
|Commissioned song
|-style="background:#dd66ff;"
|"Less Than Three (Ricardo Autobahn Remix)"
|Becky
|Disko Warp Music license
|-style="background:#dd66ff;"
|"Rave Until the Night is Over (Universe Edit)"
|DM Ashura feat. MC Jay & Weronica
|Commissioned song
|-style="background:#dd66ff;"
|"Till The Lonely's Gone"
|Z-licious
|DDR Original Song Contest winner
|-style="background:#dd66ff;"
|"Time To Move" 
|Fcdeejay
|Commissioned song
|-style="background:#dd66ff;"
|"Waiting For You" 
|C-14
|Commissioned song
|-
!colspan="3" style="background:#ffffff;"|New Konami originals
|-style="background:#77ccff;"
|"aftershock!!" 
|DM Ashura
|New Konami original song
|-style="background:#77ccff;"
|"Angel" 
|Master Source
|New Konami original song
|-style="background:#77ccff;"
|"Big City Lights" 
|Big Idea
|New Konami original song
|-style="background:#77ccff;"
|"Come Back" 
|Gein
|New Konami original song
|-style="background:#77ccff;"
|"Consuela" 
|Captain.T
|New Konami original song
|-style="background:#77ccff;"
|"CONTROL (The Attic Remix)" 
|90 GROOVERS
|New Konami original song
|-style="background:#77ccff;"
|"dirty digital" 
|kors k
|New Konami original song
|-style="background:#77ccff;"
|"Dummy" 
|RAM
|New Konami original song
|-style="background:#77ccff;"
|"EtoSharu" 
|oo39.com
|New Konami original song
|-style="background:#77ccff;"
|"Feel The Beat"
|Master Source
|New Konami original song
|-style="background:#77ccff;"
|"Hey, What's Your Name"
|Big Idea
|New Konami original song
|-style="background:#77ccff;"
|"HOLD YOU IN MY ARMS (Danceforze dream mix)" 
|NM feat. Asher
|New Konami original song
|-style="background:#77ccff;"
|"Inspiration" 
|Togo Project feat. Mayumi
|New Konami original song
|-style="background:#77ccff;"
|"Just Pretend" 
|Big Idea
|New Konami original song
|-style="background:#77ccff;"
|"KEEP ON MOVING (Orbit1 remix)" 
|D'n'B Stars
|New Konami original song
|-style="background:#77ccff;"
|"Kimochi" 
|NAOKI feat. Melody & Mezzo
|New Konami original song
|-style="background:#77ccff;"
|"L.A. EVOLVED" 
|NAOKI underground
|New Konami original song
|-style="background:#77ccff;"
|"Lament Configuration"
|Rephaim
|New Konami original song
|-style="background:#77ccff;"
|"Less Is More" 
|lim's Sculpture
|New Konami original song
|-style="background:#77ccff;"
|"My Hero" 
|In Geer
|New Konami original song
|-style="background:#77ccff;"
|"NRG Surge"
|oo39.com
|New Konami original song
|-style="background:#77ccff;"
|"ONCE UPON A TIME (Jertz mix)"
|Mitsu-O! Summer 2008
|New Konami original song
|-style="background:#77ccff;"
|"Out of Decaf" 
|NEKOJIRA
|New Konami original song
|-style="background:#77ccff;"
|"sakura storm" 
|Ryu☆
|New Konami original song
|-style="background:#77ccff;"
|"senses (Kaiju Remix)"
|JT.1UP
|New Konami original song
|-style="background:#77ccff;"
|"Streamline" 
|Karuto
|New Konami original song
|-style="background:#77ccff;"
|"Tesla Coil" 
|Rephaim
|New Konami original song
|-style="background:#77ccff;"
|"Your Angel"
|DM Ashura feat. kors k
|New Konami original song
|-style="background:#ff4444;"
|"Akibarrific" 
|Ko Kimura
|New Konami original song
|-style="background:#ff4444;"
|"ΔMAX" (delta MAX) 
|DM Ashura
|New Konami original song
|-style="background:#ff4444;"
|"888" 
|DJ TECHNORCH
|New Konami original song
|-style="background:#ffffff;"
!colspan="3"|New BEMANI crossovers and DDR revivals
|-style="background:#ffbb88;"
|"100 Sec. Kitchen Battle!!" 
|Orange Lounge
|from Pop'n Music
|-style="background:#ffbb88;"
|"777" 
|EeL
|from GuitarFreaks/DrumMania
|-style="background:#ffbb88;"
|"Absolute" 
|dj TAKA
|from DDR 5th MIX
|-style="background:#ffbb88;"
|"Kind Lady"
|OKUYATOS
|from DDRMAX
|-style="background:#ffbb88;"
|"MATSURI JAPAN"
|RE-VENGE
|from DDR 5th MIX
|-style="background:#ffbb88;"
|"Midnight Blaze (SySF Mix)" 
|System S.F.
|from DDRMAX (ending credits)
|-style="background:#ffbb88;"
|"MOBO*MOGA" 
|Orange Lounge
|from DDR EXTREME
|-style="background:#ffbb88;"
|"PARANOiA Rebirth" 
|190'
|from DDR 3rd MIX
|-style="background:#ff4444;"
|"Concertino In Blue"
|Hirofumi Sasaki
|from GuitarFreaks/DrumMania|-style="background:#ff4444;"
|"murmur twins" 
|yu_tokiwa.djw
|from DDR SuperNOVA|-style="background:#bb88ff;"
!colspan="3"|Downloadable songs
|-style="background:#dddddd;"
|"Celebration"
|wavegroup
|Kool and the Gang cover song, original version later used in DanceDanceRevolution|-style="background:#dddddd;"
|"Glamorous"
|Somatone
|Fergie cover song
|-style="background:#dddddd;"
|"I'm Coming Out"
|Somatone
|Diana Ross cover song, original version later used in Dance Dance Revolution Hottest Party 3|-style="background:#dddddd;"
|"Irreplaceable"
|wavegroup
|Beyoncé cover song
|-style="background:#dddddd;"
|"What Is Love?"
|Somatone
|Haddaway cover song
|-style="background:#dddddd;"
|"39th St. Strut"
|oo39.com
|New Konami original song
|-style="background:#dddddd;"
|"Dance Till The Sun Come Up"
|Big Idea
|New Konami original song
|-style="background:#dddddd;"
|"HIT THE GROUND" (Alexa Remix)
|NAOKI
|New Konami original song
|-style="background:#dddddd;"
|"Jewelya Of De' Nile
|Big Idea"
|New Konami original song
|-style="background:#dddddd;"
|"Lady Be Good To Me"
|In Geer
|New Konami original song
|-style="background:#dddddd;"
|"Musk Up"
|The Blue Light Specialists
|New Konami original song
|-style="background:#dddddd;"
|"oarfish"
|kors k
|New Konami original song
|-style="background:#dddddd;"
|"Rhythm Of My Heart"
|Master Source
|New Konami original song
|-style="background:#dddddd;"
|"vertical"
|Ryu*
|New Konami original song
|-style="background:#dddddd;"
|"You're Such a Shredder"
|In Geer
|New Konami original song
|-style="background:#dddddd;"
|"A Dream"
|Big Idea
|New Konami original song
|-style="background:#dddddd;"
|"koibana"
|Togo Project feat. Manna
|New Konami original song
|-
|}
Songs mentioned on the back of the box but not available in the game:
"It Takes Two" Rob Base & DJ E-Z Rock
"Shake Your Groove Thing" Peaches & Herb
"Sweet Dreams (Are Made of This)" Eurythmics
"Tainted Love" Soft Cell
"Harder, Better, Faster, Stronger" Daft Punk

For the regional release of Dance Dance Revolution Universe 3 Chinese Music Special Edition, Konami added music from local artists. The song list from the North American release of Dance Dance Revolution Universe 3 remains in addition to the new music.

 Reception Dance Dance Revolution Universe 3'' received "mixed or average reviews" according to the review aggregator Metacritic.

References

External links
Dance Dance Revolution Universe 3 Chinese Music Special Edition Official site 
Konami Asia 

2008 video games
Chinese-language-only video games
Dance Dance Revolution games
Multiplayer online games
Video games developed in China
Video games developed in the United States
Xbox 360-only games
Xbox 360 games